Douains is a commune in the Eure department in Normandy in northern France, six kilometres from Vernon.

Douains is the home of the animal cemetery Les Jardins du Souvenir, which was founded in 1999 with about 400 tombs.

Population

See also
Communes of the Eure department

References

External links

 Les jardins du souvenir

Communes of Eure